Marie Leopoldine Blahetka (16 November 1809 – 17 January 1885) was an Austrian pianist and composer.

Life 
Leopoldine Blahetka was born in Guntramsdorf near Vienna, the child of George and Barbara Joseph Blahetka Sophia, née Traeg. Her father was a history and mathematics teacher and had good relations with Ludwig van Beethoven, and her mother a physharmonica teacher and performer. Her maternal grandfather was the Viennese composer Andreas Traeg.

The family moved to Vienna and George Blahetka took a job with the Traeg music publishing house. Leopoldine took piano lessons from her mother and made her debut as a pianist in 1818. Afterwards, she studied with Joseph Czerny, Hieronymus Payer, Eduard Freiherr von Lannoy, Joachim Hoffmann, Catherina Cibbini-Kozeluch, Friedrich Kalkbrenner, Ignaz Moscheles, and later composition with Simon Sechter.

In 1821 Blahetka began touring Europe, accompanied by her mother, and continued to tour for about twenty years. In about 1830 the family moved to Boulogne-sur-Mer, France, seeking a better climate. Blahetka died in Boulogne-sur Mer.

Works 
Selected works include:
 op. 9, Grande polonaise concertante pour le piano forte et violoncello
 op. 13, Variations sur un thème favorite		
 op. 14, Variations brillantes	
 op. 15, Sonate for violin	
 op. 16, Nr. 1, 6 Deutsche Lieder: Die Nebelbilder	
 op. 16, Nr. 2, 6 Deutsche Lieder: Der Getröstete	
 op. 16, Nr. 3, 6 Deutsche Lieder: Die Totenklage	
 op. 16, Nr. 4, 6 Deutsche Lieder: Die fernen Berge	
 op. 16, Nr. 5, 6 Deutsche Lieder: Sehnsucht	
 op. 16, Nr. 6, 6 Deutsche Lieder: Matrosenlied	
 op. 18, Variations brillantes sur un thème hongrois	
 op. 19, Polonaise D-Dur	
 op. 20, Variations brillantes sur le Siège de Corinthe	
 op. 25, Konzertstück for piano and (optional) string quartet or orchestra
 op. 26, Six Valses avec Trio et Coda	
 op. 26a, Variationen über ein Thema aus der Oper 'Die Stumme' von Portici	
 op. 27, Variations sur un thème tyrolien		
 op. 28, Variations sur la chanson nationale autrichienne Gott erhalte Franz den Kaiser	
 op. 29, Variations sur un thème de Gallenberg		
 op. 32, Rastlose Liebe
 op. 39, Introduction and Variations for flute and piano
 op. 43, Piano Quartet
 op. 44, 2nd Piano Quartet
 op. 47, Grand Duo (for Piano 4-hands)
 op. 48, Capriccio for Piano

References

External links 

1809 births
1885 deaths
19th-century classical composers
19th-century Austrian people
Austrian classical composers
Women classical composers
Austrian people of Czech descent
Austrian expatriates in France
People from Mödling District
19th-century women composers